In poker, an overlay is the gap between a poker tournament's guaranteed prize pool and the actual prize pool generated by entrants.

For example, if a tournament has a guaranteed prize pool of $10,000, a buy in of $100 and 90 players enter, the players will contribute only $9,000 to the prizepool. The rest of the prizepool (in this example $1,000)—made up by the tournament host—would be the overlay for the tournament.

Overlays are far more common in online poker than in live poker simply due to the volume of tournaments online and the fierce competition for players online.

Poker gameplay and terminology